<mapframe
text="Cluster of outbuildings associated with Kensington Palace, including Ivy Cottage"
width=242
height=242
zoom=18
latitude=51.5061
longitude=-0.18905/>
Ivy Cottage is a house in the grounds of Kensington Palace in London, England.

It is a grace-and-favour property, originally housing servants. Princess Eugenie, and her husband, Jack Brooksbank, resided in the cottage from April 2018 to November 2020. In May 2022, it was announced that they had once again taken up residence at the property and would divide their time between London and Portugal.

References

Houses in the Royal Borough of Kensington and Chelsea
Kensington Palace
Royal residences in the United Kingdom